Cryptomyelois irmhilda is a species of snout moth in the genus Cryptomyelois. It was described by Roesler and Küppers, in 1979, and is known from northern Sumatra.

References

Moths described in 1979
Phycitini